The 2013–14 season is Hrvatski Dragovoljac's first season back in the Prva HNL since their promotion in 2012.  This article shows player statistics and all official matches that the club will play during the 2013–14 season.

Squad

Competitions

Prva HNL

Results summary

Results

Table

References

NK Hrvatski Dragovoljac seasons
Hrvatski Dragovoljac